The 2nd IAAF World Athletics Final was held at the Stade Louis II, in Monte Carlo, Monaco on September 18, and September 19, 2004.

The hammer throw event for men and women had to take place in Szombathely, Hungary a week previous as the Monaco stadium was not large enough to hold the event.

One of the main highlights was the men's 3000 metres steeplechase. This was won by Saif Saeed Shaheen of Qatar, (formerly Stephen Cherono of Kenya), who won in a championship record of 7:56.94 despite the fact that the field had been held up by Wesley Kiprotich clattering into the first barrier. Shaheen had been unable to compete in the recent 2004 Summer Olympics due to his change of nationality but had set the world record of 7:53.63 minutes in Brussels just ten days after the Olympic final.

Another highlight was the pole vault competition where Timothy Mack cleared 6.01 m to join the exclusive 6 metres club.

Medal summary

Men

Women

Medal table

References

Results
Official results

External links
Official website

2004
World Athletics Final
World Athletics Final
World Athletics Final
International athletics competitions hosted by Hungary
International athletics competitions hosted by Monaco